Norwegian county road 412 (Fv412) is a Norwegian county road in Åmli municipality in Agder county, Norway.

References

Åmli
412
Road transport in Agder